Bounou is a small town in the Bagassi Department of Balé Province in southern Burkina Faso. The town has a population of 2464.

References

Populated places in the Boucle du Mouhoun Region
Balé Province